Alexander McNiven Thomson (20 February 1921 – 2010) was a Scotland international rugby union player. Thomson played as a Lock.

Rugby Union career

Amateur career

Thomson played for University of St. Andrews.

Provincial career

Thomson was selected for the combined North of Scotland team to play the South on 12 November 1949.

International career

He was capped for Scotland just once. He played in the Scotland v Ireland match at Murrayfield Stadium on 26 February 1949 in the Five Nations tournament.

References

1921 births
2010 deaths
Rugby union players from Perth and Kinross
North of Scotland (combined side) players
Scottish rugby union players
Scotland international rugby union players
University of St Andrews RFC players
Rugby union locks